Cannelton Historic District is a national historic district located at Cannelton, Perry County, Indiana.  The district encompasses 178 contributing buildings, 42 contributing structures, and 2 contributing objects in the central business district and surrounding residential and industrial areas of Cannelton.  The area developed between 1837 and 1936, and includes notable examples of Gothic Revival, Late Victorian, and Bungalow / American Craftsman style architecture.  A number of the buildings are constructed of native sandstone.  Notable buildings include the National Historic Landmark Indiana Cotton Mill (1849-1850), St. Michael's Church (1859), F. H. Clemens Store, Cannelton Sewer Pipe Company, Josie Nicolay House, Myers Grade School / The Free School (1868), Jacob Heck Building (1882), Perry County Courthouse (1896-1897), and the separately listed St. Luke's Episcopal Church.

It was listed on the National Register of Historic Places in 1987.

References

External links

Historic American Buildings Survey in Indiana
Historic districts on the National Register of Historic Places in Indiana
Gothic Revival architecture in Indiana
Victorian architecture in Indiana
Buildings and structures in Perry County, Indiana
National Register of Historic Places in Perry County, Indiana